was a Japanese actress active from 1938 to 1964. She appeared in over 150 films under the direction of filmmakers like Mikio Naruse, Kenji Mizoguchi and Hiroshi Shimizu.

Biography
After graduating from Otsuma Girls' High School, Tokyo, Mitsuko Miura joined the Nichigeki dancing team before signing to the Shochiku film studio. She gave her film debut in 1938 with Hotaru no hikari and appeared in films of Hiroshi Shimizu, Kenji Mizoguchi and Noboru Nakamura. After 1950, she worked for numerous different film companies, starring, among others, in a number of films of Mikio Naruse. She retired from film business in 1964 and died in 1969.

Selected filmography
 1938: Hotaru no hikari (螢の光) – dir. Yasushi Sasaki
 1938: The Masseurs and a Woman (按摩と女 Anma to onna) – dir. Hiroshi Shimizu
 1940: Nobuko (信子 Nobuko) – dir. Hiroshi Shimizu
 1940: Himetaru kokoro (秘めたる心) – dir. Hideo Ōba
 1941: The 47 Ronin a.k.a. The Loyal 47 Ronin of the Genroku Era (元禄忠臣蔵 Genroku chūshingura) – dir. Kenji Mizoguchi
 1942: Aratanaru kōfuku (新たなる幸福) – dir. Noboru Nakamura
 1945: Izu no musumetachi (伊豆の娘たち) – dir. Heinosuke Gosho
 1946: Morning for the Osone Family (大曾根家の朝	Ōsone-ke no asa)  – dir. Keisuke Kinoshita
 1946: Victory of Women (女性の勝利 Josei no shōri) – dir. Kenji Mizoguchi
 1948: The Portrait (肖像 Shōzō) – dir. Keisuke Kinoshita
 1950: White Beast (白い野獣 Shiroi yaju) – dir. Mikio Naruse
 1952: Sisters of Nishijin (西陣の姉妹 Nishijin no shimai) – dir. Kōzaburō Yoshimura 
 1952: Lightning	(稲妻 Inazuma) – dir. Mikio Naruse
 1956: The Kuroda Affair (黒田騒動 Kuroda sōdō) – dir. Tomu Uchida
 1957: Untamed (あらくれ Arakure) – dir. Mikio Naruse
 1964: Naked Shadow (裸の影 Hadaka no kage) – dir. Kōji Wakamatsu

References

External links
 
 

1917 births
1969 deaths
20th-century Japanese actresses
Japanese film actresses
People from Tokyo